Arkia, legally incorporated as Arkia Israeli Airlines Ltd (I will soar), is an Israeli airline. Its head office is on the grounds of Sde Dov Airport in Tel Aviv, Israel. It is Israel's second-largest airline, operating scheduled domestic and international services, as well as charter flights to destinations in Western Europe and across the Mediterranean. Its main base is Ben Gurion Airport, with hub at Ramon Airport.

History

Foundation and early years
Arkia was founded in 1949 as Israel Inland Airlines when it became clear that there was demand for a local airline to connect Tel Aviv with different regions of the then-new state of Israel, especially with Eilat, Israel's important seaport situated on the Gulf of Aqaba. Flights commenced in 1950 with De Havilland DH.89 aircraft, followed by Douglas DC-3s, to inter-connect major towns in Israel from Rosh Pina in the North to the port of Eilat in the South. El Al held a 50% stake in the airline at this time with the Histadrut, Israel's labour federation, being the other shareholder. The airline later adopted the name Eilata Airlines - Aviron, and Arkia Israel Airlines.  In its first year of service, Israel Inland Airlines carried 13,485 passengers, using a Curtis Commando.

During the 1950s, the airline continued to grow, upgrading its fleet to the larger DC-3, and operating two flights a day on the Tel Aviv-Eilat route. This allowed Arkia to have annual passenger figures of over 70,000. As Eilat continued to grow during the 1960s, so did the airline, introducing the Handley Page Dart Herald 200 turboprop aircraft to its fleet between 1967 and 1968, enabling Arkia to expand with new routes to Jerusalem, and Sharm-el-Sheikh. A subsidiary, Kanaf Arkia Airline and Aviation Services, was founded when the airline acquired 50% of the stock of Kanaf Airlines and Aviation Services, and, by the end of the 1960s, scheduled flights were in operation across Israel, from Rosh Pinna in the north, to Ofira in the south.

In March 1980, Kanaf Arkia acquired the remaining stock of Arkia and merged the two operators.  The airline grew quickly during the 1980s, moving both into the international charter market and airline maintenance.

Development during the 2000s
The airline is now owned by Kanaf-Arkia Airlines (70%) and airline employees (30%). In 2006, the Nakash brothers of Jordache Enterprises bought Knafaim's 70% share.

In February 2007, the Israeli Tourism Ministry awarded Arkia a scheduled operator's licence for flights to Dublin, and Larnaca, a destination dropped by EL AL. In July 2007, it was announced that the airline planned to file for further scheduled carrier status on routes to New York City and Bangkok, currently served under charter status. Furthermore, in early 2008, after the Israeli Tourism Ministry opened up the airline market, the airline applied for scheduled carrier status for routes to Barcelona, Berlin, Moscow, and Paris.  The licence for Paris was granted in February 2008, and the airline announced that both economy and business class would be offered on this route.  At this time, the airline also announced that it would add two Boeing 737 aircraft to its fleet within two years, as well as four Boeing 787 Dreamliner aircraft it had on order which were to delivered in 2012. The order for the 787s was moved to a leasing subsidiary owned by MG Aviation and leased to Norwegian Air Shuttle. The order was replaced with an order for 4 A330neo aircraft.

In November 2018, Arkia became the launch customer of the Airbus A321LR when it received its first aircraft of the type.

Destinations

Fleet

Current aircraft

The Arkia Israel Airlines fleet includes the following aircraft :

Former aircraft

Arkia Israel Airlines has also operated the following aircraft:

Livery
In May 2017 Arkia unveiled a new livery, ahead of the delivery of new aircraft, which consists of a lower-case 'a' on the vertical fin, which also features the striping effect and multicoloured stripes on the aft section and the winglets of each aircraft. The colour of the stripes and logo will vary between each aircraft.

Incidents and accidents
 On 28 November 2002, Arkia Israel Airlines Flight 582, a Boeing 757-300, was narrowly missed by two anti-aircraft missiles, fired at it shortly after take-off from Moi International Airport in Mombasa, Kenya. The plane continued onward and landed safely in Tel Aviv, Israel. The incident occurred approximately 20 minutes before the Kenyan hotel bombing.

References

External links

 

Airlines established in 1950
1949 establishments in Israel
Airlines of Israel
Companies based in Tel Aviv
Israeli brands